Salida del Sol Estates is a colonia and census-designated place (CDP) in Hidalgo County, Texas, United States. It was first listed as a CDP prior to the 2020 census.

References 

Populated places in Hidalgo County, Texas
Census-designated places in Hidalgo County, Texas
Census-designated places in Texas